Ramecia is a genus of ant-loving beetles in the family Staphylinidae. There are at least three described species in Ramecia.

Species
These three species belong to the genus Ramecia:
 Ramecia capitula (Casey, 1884)
 Ramecia crinita (Brendel, 1865)
 Ramecia discreta Casey

References

Further reading

 
 

Pselaphinae
Articles created by Qbugbot